The 2013 Pan American Individual Event Artistic Gymnastics Championships were held in San Juan, Puerto Rico, August 8–11, 2013. The competition was organized by the Puerto Rican Gymnastics Federation and approved by the International Gymnastics Federation.

Medal summary

Medalists

Medal table

References

2013 in gymnastics
2013
International gymnastics competitions hosted by Puerto Rico
2013 in Puerto Rican sports